Winchester Township may refer to the following townships

in the United States:
 Winchester Township, Norman County, Minnesota
 Winchester Township, Adams County, Ohio

in Canada:
 Winchester Township, Ontario